John Stewart of Ralston was a 14th—century Scottish noble. He was a son of Walter Stewart, 6th High Steward of Scotland and Isabel Graham. He was the half brother of King Robert II of Scotland.

Captured during the Battle of Neville's Cross on 17 October 1346 and became a hostage for conduct of King David II of Scotland.

Marriage and issue
John married Alicia, daughter of Reginald de Mure and Sybilla de Graham, they are known to have had the following issue:
John Stewart, died without issue.
Walter Stewart, died without issue.
Marjorie Stewart, married firstly Alexander Lindsay of Glenesk and secondly William Douglas of Lugton, had issue.
Ergadia Stewart, married Patrick de Graham of Kincardine and Dundaff, had issue.
Margaret Stewart, married John Hay of Tullbody, had issue.
Isabel Stewart

Citations

References

Year of birth unknown
Year of death unknown
14th-century Scottish people
John